Alexander Gustav Adolf Graf von Schleinitz (born 29 December 1807 in Blankenburg am Harz; died 19 February 1885 in Berlin) was the Foreign Minister of Prussia from 1858 to 1861 and minister for the royal household from late 1861 to his death.

Life

Early years 
He came from an old aristocratic family from the Margraviate of Meissen that was elevated to the rank of Reichsfreiherr already in the 16th century; his father was the Regierungspräsident of Blankenburg, and later minister of state in the Duchy of Brunswick, Karl Ferdinand Freiherr von Schleinitz (1756-1837); his mother was Barbara von Hochstetter (1768-1819). He was the brother of the minister of state of Brunswick, Wilhelm von Schleinitz (1794-1856), and of the Prussian Regierungspräsident Julius von Schleinitz (1806-1865).

Schleinitz studied in Göttingen and Berlin, and joined the Prussian civil service in 1828. In 1835 he became an embassy attaché, in 1841 he was made an Expert Councillor (Vortragender Rat) in the foreign ministry. In July 1848 he replaced Heinrich Alexander von Arnim as Foreign Minister, thus joining the government of Gottfried Ludolf Camphausen. However, after a few days he resigned from his post, and subsequently represented Prussia at the court of Hannover.

Political career 
In May 1849 he negotiated the peace treaty with Denmark, and in July 1849 once again took up the position of Foreign Minister in the government of Friedrich Wilhelm, Count Brandenburg. However, since his German patriotic views were not compatible with the way Prussian politics was developing, he retired from public service on 26 September 1850 as a Wirklicher Geheimer Rat, and from then lived near Koblenz in close contact with the court of the Prince of Prussia, and at Schloss Gebesee in Thuringia.

After the Prince-Regent, the later King and Emperor Wilhelm I, assumed control of the government, Schleinitz, who was one of the King's closest confidants, once again took over the Foreign Ministry, in the Prince-Regent's government of the "New Era" that was called together in November 1858. The main tenets of his foreign policy were the attempt to form an alliance with Britain and Austria, the maintenance of the balance of power in Europe and a strengthening of Prussia's role in Germany. The domestic problems of the liberal government moved him to leave the government in October 1861 and take over the Ministry of the Royal Household, where he remained to his death in 1885. From then onwards he was the arch-enemy of Otto von Bismarck, who became Prime Minister of Prussia in 1862. Prussian Liberals, as well as Bismarck himself at times saw the Household Ministry as a "Counter-Government" of Queen Augusta, to the King's conservative government.

On the occasion of the Emperor's and Empress' golden wedding anniversary, Schleinitz and his wife were elevated to the rank of Graf (Count) on 11 June 1879.

Marriage
From 1865, Alexander von Schleinitz was married to Marie von Buch (1842-1912), who was 35 years younger than he was. As Gräfin Schleinitz she became the most important salonière of the time in Berlin. Along with "Mimi", as she was known, he championed Richard Wagner and the Bayreuth Festival.

They had no children. Their joint grave, which has not been preserved, is in the Trinity Church Cemetery No. 1 in Berlin.

Honours and awards

Notes

References

Citations

Literature
 Bastian Peiffer, Alexander von Schleinitz und die preußische Außenpolitik 1858-1861. Peter Lang Verlag, Frankfurt am Main/Berlin/Bern/Bruxelles/New York/Oxford/Wien 2012, .
 Otto von Bismarck: Gedanken und Erinnerungen, ed. Ernst Friedlaender. Stuttgart 1959.
 Otto Freiherr von Schleinitz (ed.): Aus den Papieren der Familie v. Schleinitz. Mit einer Vorbemerkung von Fedor von Zobeltitz. Berlin 1904.

1807 births
1885 deaths
Counts of Germany
Prussian diplomats
Prussian politicians
People from the Harz
Foreign ministers of Prussia
Recipients of the Iron Cross (1870), 2nd class
Knights Grand Cross of the Order of Saints Maurice and Lazarus
Recipients of the Order of the Medjidie, 1st class
Grand Crosses of the Order of Saint Stephen of Hungary
Grand Croix of the Légion d'honneur
Recipients of the Order of the Netherlands Lion